"Purple Lamborghini" is a song by American DJ Skrillex and American rapper Rick Ross. It was released as a single for the motion picture soundtrack for the 2016 DC Comics film Suicide Squad on July 22, 2016, by Atlantic Records and Owsla. In the music video, Jared Leto reprises his role as The Joker from the movie. "Purple Lamborghini" received one Grammy Award nomination: Best Song Written for Visual Media in December 2016. "Purple Lamborghini" peaked at number 33 on the Billboard Hot 100.

Background
The artists co-wrote the song with Beat Billionaire, who co-produced it with Skrillex. The song contains multiple references to characters and motifs in the movie, including references to Killer Croc, Deadshot and Gotham City. It is possibly written from the perspective of the Joker, featured in both the film and music video, who is known for his affinity for purple; he wears a purple crocodile-leather trench coat, utilises purple colored weapons, and drives a purple Infiniti G35 with a Vaydor body kit.

Critical reception
Pitchfork said that the track "is almost intuitive. And Ross sounds more energetic than he has in a while, the bass clawing down to his lowest frequencies."

Music video
Skrillex uploaded the music video in August 2016, directed by Colin Tilley, onto his YouTube account which features himself, Rick Ross and Jared Leto as The Joker. The music video currently has over 500 million YouTube views as of November 2022.

In an interview with Complex, Skrillex said that it was his idea to have Leto reprise his role as The Joker in the music video:  "[The film's producers] wanted to do a music video using me and footage [of the film]. I was like, 'No, I don’t want to do one of those'. So I called Jared personally, and I really had to persuade him [to join]. He's a really good friend of mine, but for him, giving me that Joker character is not an easy thing. He really went out of his way to be a part of that video".

In that same interview, Skrillex also said that while filming the music video, Leto gifted him a box full of "a bunch of weird shit", as well as a dildo, which he described as "the biggest" he had ever seen. He responded to Leto's gifts in an awkward fashion: "I was just like, 'Thank you'". Leto's gifts to Skrillex were another one of the many crude gifts that the actor had previously given to other cast and crew members whilst on-set of the Suicide Squad movie; some of Leto's previous gifts included anal beads, used condoms and a dead pig.

Skrillex also helped co-edit and co-produce the music video alongside Vinnie Hobbs and Andrew Leiros, respectively.

Ironically, the music video for "Purple Lamborghini" does not feature an actual purple Lamborghini vehicle, as Skrillex stated in a Tweet that the company were unable to give Tilley and Atlantic Records clearance to use one in the video.

Track listing

Charts

Weekly charts

Year-end charts

Certifications

Release history

References

External links

Lyrics of this song at Genius

2016 singles
2016 songs
Music videos directed by Colin Tilley
Skrillex songs
Rick Ross songs
Song recordings produced by Skrillex
Songs written by Skrillex
Songs written by Rick Ross
Songs written for films
DC Extended Universe music
Suicide Squad (film series)
Owsla singles